Ch'uxña Quta (Aymara ch'uxña green, quta lake "green lake", also spelled Chojña Kkota) is a  mountain in the Andes of Bolivia. It is situated in the La Paz Department, Pacajes Province, Calacoto Municipality, north-west of the extinct Sajama volcano. It lies south-west of the mountain Suni Q'awa.

References 

Mountains of La Paz Department (Bolivia)